Microestola formosana is a species of beetle in the family Cerambycidae. It was described by Gressitt in 1951. It is known from Taiwan.

References

Desmiphorini
Beetles described in 1951